Stenness (pronounced ) is a village and parish on the Orkney Mainland in Scotland. It contains several notable prehistoric monuments including the Standing Stones of Stenness and the Ring of Brodgar.

Geography
Stenness parish adjoins the southern extremity of the Loch of Stenness, and also some notable standing stones. It is bounded on the west by the efflux of the loch, and a branch of Hoy Sound, and has been politically merged with Firth.

History
In Old Norse: Steinnes or Steinsnes means headland/peninsula of the stone.

The area has been inhabited for a considerable time. Near the village are several notable prehistoric monuments including the Stones of Stenness and the Ring of Brodgar.

See also
Burn of Ayreland
Happy Valley (garden)

References

External links

Vision of Britain - Stenness

This article incorporates text from Wilson, Rev. John The Gazetteer of Scotland (Edinburgh, 1882) Published by W. & A.K. Johnstone

Villages on Mainland, Orkney
Parishes of Orkney
Orkneyinga saga places